Dimitar Zapryanov (born 27 January 1960) is a Bulgarian former judoka who competed in the 1980 Summer Olympics and in the 1988 Summer Olympics.

References

1960 births
Living people
Bulgarian male judoka
Olympic judoka of Bulgaria
Judoka at the 1980 Summer Olympics
Judoka at the 1988 Summer Olympics
Olympic medalists in judo
Medalists at the 1980 Summer Olympics
Olympic silver medalists for Bulgaria
Goodwill Games medalists in judo
Competitors at the 1986 Goodwill Games